Curds and whey may refer to:

 collectively, curds and whey, the dairy products
 Little Miss Muffet, the nursery rhyme
 Cottage cheese, also called "curds and whey"
 Junket (dessert), a dish historically known as "curds and whey"

See also
 curd (disambiguation)